Matters of the Heart is the third studio album by American singer-songwriter Tracy Chapman, released on April 28, 1992, by Elektra Records. It was her first not to be produced or co-produced by David Kershenbaum.

Track listing
All songs written by Tracy Chapman.

"Bang Bang Bang" – 4:21
"So" – 3:26
"I Used to Be a Sailor" – 3:56
"The Love That You Had" – 4:11
"Woman's Work" – 2:01
"If These Are the Things" – 4:40
"Short Supply" (Jigten; For Richmond) – 4:23
"Dreaming on a World" – 5:03
"Open Arms" – 4:34
"Matters of the Heart" – 6:59

Overview

Critical reception
Matters of the Heart received generally mixed reviews from music critics.

Musical style
The record marked a notable switch in sound from Chapman's earlier works. Allmusic labeled it as "less bold and angry" than her preceding record, and Israbox took note of the "subtle elements of world music, blues, and jazz" included in the record.

Personnel

Musicians

Production

Charts

Weekly charts

Year-end charts

Certifications

References

Tracy Chapman albums
1992 albums
Albums produced by Jimmy Iovine
Elektra Records albums